The estuarine system of the North Carolina National Estuarine Research Reserve is the third largest in the country, encompassing more the . This system is of prime economic importance to the coastal area—90 percent of the commercial seafood species caught in the state spends at least part of their lives in an estuary. The North Carolina National Estuarine Research Reserve was established to preserve these fragile natural areas and the variety of life they support.

The state is representative of two major biogeographic regions located north (Virginian) and south (Carolinian) of Cape Hatteras. Therefore, NOAA and the state of North Carolina created a multi-component reserve with the following sites: Currituck Banks (960 acres near Corolla), Rachel Carson (2,625 acres near Beaufort), Masonboro Island (5,097 acres near Wrightsville Beach) and Zeke's Island (1,165 acres near Kure Beach).

References

 North Carolina National Estuarine Research Reserve

External links
The North Carolina Coastal Reserve & National Estuarine Research Reserve 

Protected areas of North Carolina
National Estuarine Research Reserves of the United States
Estuaries of North Carolina
Protected areas established in 1982
1982 establishments in North Carolina